Iran's Municipalities and Village Administrations Organization (IMO)  is a governmental organization in Iran, under the Ministry of Interior (Iran) and responsible for affairs of all municipalities around the country. The head of the IMO is one of the Ministry of Interior vice president.

Responsibility
The planning and budgeting of the city and village local authorities are all addressed by IMO and this organization is believed to be the largest administration body in Iran with almost 980,000 billion Rial cash fund in the year 1400 in Persian calendar (2021–2022) equal to 3.4 of the country's annual budget.

References

External links
 Official website of Municipalities and Village Administrations Organization

Government agencies of Iran